Rig is an unincorporated community in Hardy County, West Virginia, United States.

References 

Unincorporated communities in Hardy County, West Virginia
Unincorporated communities in West Virginia